Machon Yaakov is a baal teshuva yeshiva for men located in Har Nof, Jerusalem, Israel. Its faculty and student body are all English speaking. It is named for Yaakov Rosenberg, founder of Machon Shlomo, a similar baal teshuva yeshiva. Beryl Gershenfeld "is the Rosh Yeshiva of Machon Shlomo and Machon Yaakov."

Machon Yaakov's program
Machon Yaakov, was founded in 2005 to, in their own words, "double Machon Shlomo’s capacity without compromising its core philosophy or commitment to excellence." The program, which is designed for students with little or no formal Jewish education, has a one-year minimum and a two-year maximum. Enrollment is limited to about 35 students, generally weighted about 2/3-1/3 between the first- and second- year programs.

Machon Yaakov's 2018-2019 year started August 21, 2018, and finished after Shavuot, on June 10, 2019. Machon Yaakov is affiliated with various summer programs for those students interested in continuing studies in Jerusalem during the 10-week summer period between 1st and 2nd years.

Financial aid is available to students on need-based merit. Students receiving tuition assistance—which is generally provided by philanthropists, many of whom are yeshiva graduates—are expected to make a moral commitment to repaying the funds when they begin or re-join their careers in order to make such opportunities available to future students.

Yaakov Rosenberg
Gershenfield is his son-in-law. Yaakov's father's name was Alexander Shlomo, the source of the name he used when he founded Machon Shlomo. Alexander Shlomo Rosenberg "headed the Orthodox Union's Kosher Division from 1950 until ..."

Yaakov Rosenberg (1929-1999) was "one of the founders of Ohr Somayach.

Machon Shlomo
Its full name is Machon Shlomo: Alexander and Eva Heiden Torah Institute, sometimes written as Machon Shlomo - The Heiden Institute. A former staff member described it as "a yeshiva for motivated beginners." Some of their students spend as little as one month there, when recommended by other Jewish organizations, as part of their path in their return to Torah-true Judaism.

History 
Machon Shlomo was established in 1982 with a little understudy body and a little staff, in a high rise that remained at the passage to a juvenile Jerusalem area called Har Nof. At that point, the network consisted of twelve recently completed structures roosted on a mountainside, flanked on one or the other side by woods and miles of lacking area. The main street to the primary city was a soil way. It was this unassuming area, a long way from the clamor of the city and the interruptions of the travel industry, that the yeshiva's organizer, Rabbi Yaakov Rosenberg zt"l, hand-picked as the site where roused understudies could fabricate themselves to accomplish enormity.

The vision was to pick quality over amount, to acknowledge a little however select understudy body, and show them the aptitudes to turn into the following Jewish pioneers and mainstays of their networks. Regardless of whether their experiences were ready to go, law, medication, or human expressions, the main models was that they needed to learn. Like Rabbi Rosenberg did himself, these understudies would figure out how to adjust an existence of Torah with an existence of family and work. They would discover that genuine significance must be acknowledged in each aspect of life. Those underlying understudies proceeded to have unprecedented existences, demonstrating that a little, centered program could create enormous waves in the Jewish world.

As the network of Har Nof developed, so did Machon Shlomo, while keeping up its unique honesty. The yeshiva came to possess three stories of the structure to incorporate quarters and an eating office. Somewhere in the range of ten and fifteen understudies were conceded every year, for a limit of two years. The staff numbered more than ten, to safeguard the individual consideration that every understudy merited. In barely ten years, Machon Shlomo got known as the "Elite level" yeshiva, a spot generally advantageous and most splendid to come and rediscover the fortunes of their centuries old legacy.

In 1999, Rabbi Rosenberg died, leaving the yeshiva under the bearing of his children in-law, Rabbi Beryl Gershenfeld and Rabbi Pinchas Auerbach. The custom of greatness keeps, drawing from the Slobodka mussar approach, which underscores that achievement can be accomplished just when an individual can understand his internal significance.

Today Machon Shlomo gains ground into the future while staying near its underlying foundations. The yeshiva actually possesses its equivalent home in 2 Shaulzon, yet has included more space to the structure and is currently redesigning its offices. The understudy body is as yet kept little, with a huge staff to understudy proportion, taking into consideration the individual thoughtfulness regarding every understudy. With a graduated class base of hundreds, understudies today appreciate the advantages of the MS people group through yearly occasions, Shabbatons, and openings for work. Har Nof is presently an outstanding Jerusalem area, home to probably the best Torah researchers today, just as the absolute generally inviting and neighborly families, who are more than anxious to have understudies at their shabbos tables. The vision of the yeshiva keeps on being devoted to creating understudies who are focused on building their latent capacity and the significance of the Jewish public.

Yosemite yeshiva
A summer program in Yosemite, operating "Under the auspices of Machon Shlomo Institute for Torah Studies" was started, like Machon Yakov's year-round program: in memory of Yaakov Rosenberg. The Yosemite program's goal was described as "to immerse oneself in the yeshiva lifestyle" but "committing to a whole year" (or longer).

References

External links
Machon Yaakov
 Machon Shlomo

Orthodox yeshivas in Jerusalem
Baalei teshuva institutions
Haredi Judaism in Jerusalem
Haredi yeshivas
Orthodox Jewish outreach